The 2013–14 Telekom S-League was the 10th season of the Telekom S-League in the Solomon Islands. Solomon Warriors won the championship for the second time and also qualified as the Solomon Islands representative for the 2014–15 OFC Champions League. All matches were played at the hillside ground called Lawson Tama Stadium, with an approximate capacity of 20,000.

Teams 
Hana (Honiara)
Koloale FC (Honiara)
Kossa FC (Honiara)
Malaita Kingz FC (Malaita)
Marist Fire (Honiara)
Real Kakamora FC (Makira-Ulawa)
Solomon Warriors (Honiara)
Western United (Western)
X-Beam (Honiara)

Standings 

[ * ] All matches of the first eight rounds were awarded 3–0 against Marist Fire F.C. due to failure to pay registration fees, resulting in disqualification from the competition.

Top scorers

References 

Solomon Islands S-League seasons
Solomon
Solomon
football
football